WXOJ-LP (103.3 FM, "Valley Free Radio") is a non-profit, independent community radio station licensed to serve Northampton, Massachusetts as well as the central Pioneer Valley region.  The station was first licensed to Foundation For Media Education Inc. until April 2010 when it was transferred to Valley Free Radio, inc. It airs a Public Radio format on its FM radio frequency, as well as through a live streaming service on its website. WXOJ is known as the original broadcast station of the nationally syndicated radio and television program The David Pakman Show (originally Midweek Politics with David Pakman) and the nationally syndicated radio program "Madness Radio," and was the home of a popular current-events program hosted by then-business owner and current Northampton City Council member Bill Dwight. The station also hosts locally produced programming at its main studios in the village of Florence, Massachusetts, such as The Enviro Show, Occupy the Airwaves, Farm to Fork, Bread & Roses, The Warm Heart of Africa, Poison Ivy of the Mind, Press Start to Continue and more. As an affiliate, VFR airs other local and national content from the Pacifica Radio Network.

Valley Free Radio is volunteer-run and provides training in live programming, broadcast equipment technology, and digital audio production and editing to its members, as well as studio space for DJs and programmers. In addition, it houses the David S Dow Recording Studio; a secondary recording studio for pre-recorded content to be made.

The station was assigned the "WXOJ-LP" call letters by the Federal Communications Commission on May 11, 2004. The station was launched with assistance from the Philadelphia-based Prometheus Radio Project.

See also
List of community radio stations in the United States

References

External links

Valley Free Radio's official website
 Valley Free Radio's Facebook page
 

XOJ-LP
XOJ-LP
Community radio stations in the United States
Radio stations established in 2005
Mass media in Hampshire County, Massachusetts
Northampton, Massachusetts
2005 establishments in Massachusetts